Jarbek is a river of Schleswig-Holstein, Germany. It flows into the Passader See, which is drained by the Hagener Au.

See also
List of rivers of Schleswig-Holstein

Rivers of Schleswig-Holstein
1Jarbek
Rivers of Germany